Tony Sands is a former American football running back. He played in college at the University of Kansas.

College career
Sands is most notable for holding the all-time Football Bowl Subdivision (FBS) record for the most rushing attempts in a single game, with 58 carries. In the same game, Sands broke the FBS record for most yards in a game with 396, a record that stood for eight years until it was broken by LaDainian Tomlinson in 1999. Both records were originally set by Sands during a game against Missouri on November 23, 1991. Kansas won the game 53–29 with Sands accounting for four touchdowns. He finished his senior season with 1,442 yards and nine touchdowns and was named the Big Eight Offensive Player of the Year.

Pro career and coaching career
Sands had a brief stint with the Arizona Cardinals and also briefly coached for Kansas. Many have stated that Sands was likely overlooked for an extended pro career due to his short stature at 5 ft 6 in. Since 1993, Sands has run a speed training program for NFL and college football players.

References

Living people
American football running backs
Kansas Jayhawks football coaches
Kansas Jayhawks football players
Players of American football from Fort Lauderdale, Florida
St. Thomas Aquinas High School (Florida) alumni
Year of birth missing (living people)